The Yellow Claw is a 1915 crime novel by Arthur Henry Sarsfield Ward, known better under his pseudonym of Sax Rohmer.

The story features Gaston Max, a Parisian criminal investigator and master of disguise, and his battle with Mr. King, a master criminal similar to Rohmer's earlier character Dr. Fu Manchu.

Film adaptation
The novel was the basis for the 1921 British silent film The Yellow Claw.

External links
Full text at 

 
Blogging Sax Rohmer’s The Yellow Claw

1915 British novels
British novels adapted into films
Crime novels
Novels by Sax Rohmer
Novels set in Paris